C. roseus may refer to:
 Carpodacus roseus, the Pallas's rosefinch, a bird species
 Catharanthus roseus, the Madagascar periwinkle, a plant species endemic to Madagascar
 Cotoneaster roseus, a plant species native to portions of the Himalayas, Iran, northern and western Pakistan, northwest India and Kashmir

Synonyms
 Cryptochilus roseus, a synonym for Eria rosea, a plant
 Clastes roseus, a synonym for Peucetia viridans, the green lynx spider

See also
 Roseus (disambiguation)